George Weidler may refer to:
 George Washington Weidler (1837–1908), American businessman
 George William Weidler (1926–1989), American saxophonist